Colonel Mikko (Karl Johan Michael) Collan (22 July 1881 – 3 October 1964) was a Finnish military officer, farmer, and politician, born in Nurmes. He was a member of the National Progressive Party. He served as Minister of Provisions in Lauri Ingman's first cabinet (27 November 1918 – 17 April 1919); in Kaarlo Castrén's cabinet (17 April 1919 – 15 September 1919); and in Juho Vennola's first cabinet (15 September 1919 – 15 March 1920). He was also a Member of Parliament (1 April 1920 – 8 October 1920).

References 

1881 births
1964 deaths
People from Nurmes
People from Kuopio Province (Grand Duchy of Finland)
National Progressive Party (Finland) politicians
Government ministers of Finland
Members of the Parliament of Finland (1919–22)
Russian military personnel of World War I